Ravshan Sayfiddinovich Irmatov (born August 9, 1977) is an Uzbek professional football referee.
He  officiated in the Uzbek League from 2000-2019 and internationally from 2003-2019. Irmatov holds the record for officiating the most FIFA World Cup matches with 11.

In June 2019, Ravshan Irmatov was appointed as the first Vice-President of the Uzbekistan Football Association. The first Vice-President of this organization is the de facto leader of Uzbekistan’s football. He began reforms in Uzbekistani football after long criticism and corruption scandals in the country's football. During the inauguration, he said, “If we all come together and work for the same goal, we will overcome any difficulties”.

Biography and career
He was born on Avgust 9 in 1977 in Tashkent in footballers' family. Irmatov's father was also a referee, working in Soviet competitions. He has been a full international referee for FIFA since 2003. He is considered one of the elite referees in the world. He was selected as a referee for the 2007 FIFA U-20 World Cup in Canada, where he refereed the group stage match between Gambia and Mexico, as well as the match between Chile and Congo.

He was named The Best Referee in Asia in four consecutive years (2008, 2009, 2010, 2011 and 2014), and he was selected to officiate the final match of both the 2008 and 2011 FIFA Club World Cup.

Irmatov was selected as a referee for the 2010 FIFA World Cup and was in charge of the opening match between South Africa and Mexico on June 11. Irmatov equalled the record for number of matches in charge in a single FIFA World Cup when he took charge of the Netherlands-Uruguay semi-final. He took charge of the World Cup 2010 Group C Fixture, where England met Algeria in Cape Town – thus becoming the youngest official to take charge of an opening World Cup match since 1934 and the youngest referee of 2010 FIFA World Cup. Irmatov also officiated at the 2011 AFC Asian Cup and was selected to referee the final between Australia and Japan.

Irmatov was selected as a referee at the 2013 FIFA Confederations Cup. In the Group A match between Brazil and Italy on 22 June, he blew his whistle to award Italy a penalty and was seen pointing at the penalty spot. A second later, as play continued, Giorgio Chiellini scored with a low shot, with Irmatov instead pointing to the halfway line to signal a goal. Irmatov admitted to his mistake after the game saying: “While I was whistling for a penalty, out of the corner of my eye I saw the goal and I thought advantage should be played and gave the goal.”

On 27 December 2015 at Globe Soccer Awards ceremony in Dubai Ravshan Irmatov was named as Best Referee of the Year in 2015. On 31 December 2015 president of Uzbekistan Islam Karimov signed a decree “On awarding Ravshan Irmatov with the order Buyuk Hizmatlari Uchun” (For outstanding services).
On 4 March 2016 Irmatov was named Referee of the Year 2015 in Uzbekistan by Football Federation for 10th time after survey results among sport journalists.

In 2023, Irmatov was elected to be the AFC executive committee representative of the central zone.

Honours

Individual
 Uzbekistan Referee of the Year (10): 2006, 2007, 2008, 2009, 2010, 2011, 2012, 2013, 2014, 2015
AFC Referee of the Year (5): 2008, 2009, 2010, 2011, 2014
Globe Soccer Award for the Best Referee of the Year: 2015

Order
 El-Yurt Hurmati (Honour of people and Motherland) in 2014
 Buyuk Hizmatlari Uchun (For outstanding services) in 2015

Matches

2019 AFC Asian Cup
 vs 
 vs 
 vs  (round of 16)
 vs  (quarter-finals)
 vs  (final)
2018 FIFA World Cup
 vs 
 vs 
2017 FIFA Club World Cup
Pachuca  vs  Wydad AC (second round)
2017 FIFA Confederations Cup
Video assistant referee
2018 FIFA World Cup qualification (AFC)
 vs  (second round)
 vs  (third round)
 vs  (third round)
 vs  (third round)
 vs  (fourth round)
2015 AFC Asian Cup
 vs 
 vs 
 vs 
 vs  (semifinal)
2014 FIFA World Cup
 vs 
 vs 
 vs 
 vs  (quarter-finals)
2013 FIFA Confederations Cup
 vs 
2013 EAFF East Asian Cup
 vs  (final tournament)
2012 AFF Suzuki Cup
 vs  (final leg 2nd)
2014 FIFA World Cup qualification (AFC)
 vs  (third round)
 vs  (third round)
 vs  (third round)
 vs  (third round)
2012 Summer Olympics
 vs 
 vs 
 vs  (bronze medal match)
2011 FIFA Club World Cup
Monterrey  vs  Espérance de Tunis (match for fifth place)
Santos  vs  Barcelona (final)
2011 AFC Asian Cup
 vs 
 vs 
 vs  (quarter-finals)
 vs  (final)
2010 FIFA World Cup
 vs  (Opening match)
 vs 
 vs 
 vs  (quarter-finals)
 vs  (semi-finals)
2008 FIFA Club World Cup
 Al Ahly  vs  Pachuca (quarter-finals)
LDU Quito  vs  Manchester United (final)

See also
 List of football referees

References

External links
 FIFA Profile
 Rate Ravshan in the 2010 FIFA World Cup

1977 births
Living people
Sportspeople from Tashkent
Uzbekistani football referees
2010 FIFA World Cup referees
Olympic football referees
Football referees at the 2012 Summer Olympics
2014 FIFA World Cup referees
FIFA World Cup referees
2018 FIFA World Cup referees
CONCACAF Champions League referees
AFC Asian Cup referees